HMS Bouncer was launched at Newcastle upon Tyne in 1804 for the British Royal Navy. The French captured her in February 1805. She went through several name changes before she was condemned in 1827.

Royal Navy service
Lieutenant Samuel Bassan commissioned Bouncer in November 1804.

In February 1805 was run shore on the French coast near Dieppe where the French captured her and her crew.

French Navy service
The French Navy purchased Bouncer on 21 February 1805 and commissioned her under existing name.

On 10 November 1811 and also on 29 September 1812 Bouncer was at Boulogne-ur-Mer and under the command of Lieutenant de vaisseau de La Rouvraye.

Fate
Ecuriel (ex-Bouncer) was condemned on 28 June 1827.

Citations

References
 
  
 

1804 ships
Ships built on the River Tyne
Brigs of the Royal Navy
Captured ships
Brigs of the French Navy